Sawarn Singh is an Indian rower. He was born on 20 February 1990 at Dalelwala Mansa in Punjab, India. He primarily competes in single scull events. In 2011 he won bronze at the Asian Rowing Championships.  He qualified for 2012 Summer Olympics in Men's single scull event and reached the last 16 with a time of 7:00.49 in the first repechage. The 21-year-old Sawarn Singh Virk secured his spot in the London Olympics by winning his event at the FISA Olympic Continental Qualification Regatta for Asia in Chung Ju, Korea.  London Olympics was the maiden Olympics appearance for the Jharkhand National Games gold medallist.  He won the 2013 Asian Championships, and won bronze at the 2014 Asian Games.  He won the gold medal in the 2018 Asian Games in Men's Quadruple sculls.

Major Events

References

External links
 Sawarn Singh, Profile BBC Sport

Olympic rowers of India
Living people
1990 births
Sportspeople from Punjab, India
People from Mansa district, India
Rowers at the 2012 Summer Olympics
Indian male rowers
Rowers at the 2014 Asian Games
Asian Games medalists in rowing
Asian Games bronze medalists for India
Medalists at the 2014 Asian Games
Rowers at the 2018 Asian Games
Asian Games gold medalists for India
Medalists at the 2018 Asian Games
Recipients of the Arjuna Award